Tom Wellington (27 October 1894 – 17 July 1955) was an Australian rules footballer who played with Melbourne in the Victorian Football League (VFL).

Notes

External links 

Profile at DemonWiki

1894 births
1955 deaths
Australian rules footballers from Victoria (Australia)
Melbourne Football Club players